The 2019 Morningside Mustangs football team was an American football team that represented Morningside University as a member of the Great Plains Athletic Conference (GPAC) during the 2019 NAIA football season.

Quarterback Joe Dolincheck completed 295 of 433 passes (68.1%) for 4,303  yards and 49 touchdowns and 12 interceptions.  Running back Arnijae Ponder carried the ball 323 times for 1,884 rushing yards and 23 touchdowns.

Schedule

References

Pittsburg State
Morningside Mustangs football seasons
NAIA Football National Champions
College football undefeated seasons
Morningside Mustangs football